Hanan Hadžajlić  (born 16 August 1991) is a Bosnian composer, flutist, and researcher who is primarily known for her work in contemporary music. Hadžajlić co-founded the INSAM Institute for Contemporary Artistic Music and serves as its director.

Since 2018, Hadžajlić works as a Teaching Assistant at the Composition Department of the Sarajevo Music Academy (University of Sarajevo).

Education
Hadžajlić holds multiple degrees, including a Doctor of Musical Arts in flute performance, Master's Degree in composition, and a Master's Degree in flute performance.

She is a PhD student of Transdisciplinary Studies of Contemporary Art and Media.

Research fields
 Composition, Contemporary Improvisation and Electroacoustic Music Performance
 Transhumanist Music (machine music for acoustic instruments) and Artificial Musical Intelligence (AMI), the theory developed as a part DMA thesis Flute as 'metainterface' of modular systems in contemporary electroacoustic music 
 Transculturality, Nomadism and Globalization
 Management

Her scientific papers have been published by AM Journal of Art and Media Studies and INSAM Journal

Awards and recognition

 Reconstruction – Contemporary Music Interpretation Competition - flute (first)
 Reconstruction – Contemporary Music Interpretation Competition – chamber music (first) 
 International Flautist Gathering - Tahir Kulenović - flute (first)
 Yamaha EU Foundation - flute (first)
 TEMSIG - flute (first) 

Her composition Freezing Moon is included in the book The 21st Century Voice: Contemporary and Traditional Extra-normal Voice by Michael Edward Edgerton.

References

21st-century classical musicians
Bosnia and Herzegovina composers
21st-century classical composers
Musicians from Sarajevo
Academic staff of the University of Sarajevo
Contemporary classical composers
1991 births
Living people
Experimental musicians
Experimental composers